The 11mm Mauser (also known as the 11×60mmR Mauser or .43 Mauser) is a black-powder cartridge developed for the Mauser Model 1871 rifle, and used later in the 71/84 variant.  It is no longer in production, however it is available from custom loaders and handloading can be done.

See also
 Table of handgun and rifle cartridges

Further reading 

 The .43 Mauser, Handloader magazine, June–July 2002, Volume 37, Number 3, issue 217
 Frank C. Barnes: Cartridges of the World, Krause Publications, Iola (Wisconsin), 12th edition, 2009, ISBN 978-0-89689-936-0.

Pistol and rifle cartridges
Military cartridges